Recovery is a British television film, first broadcast on BBC One in 2007, starring David Tennant and Sarah Parish.

Summary
It deals with the life of Alan Hamilton (played by David Tennant), the former head of a construction firm, after he receives serious personality-changing brain injuries in a road accident, and the emotional feeling of his family. Tricia, his wife (played by Sarah Parish) struggles because the man she knew has gone. Throughout the programme she tries to bring him back through memories, photographs, her sons and herself.

Cast
Alan Hamilton — David Tennant
Tricia Hamilton — Sarah Parish
Dean Hamilton — Harry Treadaway
Joel Hamilton — Jacob Théato
Len Hamilton — Ron Donachie
Johnathon — Jay Simpson
Gwen — Jo McInnes
Dr Lockwood — Jim Carter
Vicky Nathan — Jo Hartley

Cast Notes
This marks the third time that David Tennant and Sarah Parish have worked together. The first was the 2004 serial, Blackpool, where David played a DI who falls in love with his suspect's wife (Parish), and the second was the Doctor Who Christmas special, "The Runaway Bride", where Tennant played his usual role as the Doctor and Parish played a giant alien spider called the Empress of the Racnoss.

Music
 The music was especially commissioned and composed by Tristin Norwell and Nick Green.

Reception
The Liverpool Echo called Recovery "perhaps the best thing David Tennant's ever done."
The Herald called it "one of TV's saddest, most harrowing dramas ever" and encouraged people to donate to the brain injury charity, Headway, whether they had seen the drama or not.
 The Times said that "Tennant and Parish made it affecting viewing" and that they also "thankfully avoided the Hollywood trend to use memory loss as a gateway to deeper healing, a little miracle to help us forget our mean adult selves and learn to be innocent again."
 The Guardian said "It wasn't over-sentimental, just believable. And much more powerful for that. Anyone who says they didn't have a lump in their throats is either an unfeeling brute or a liar."
 The Scotsman said, "This is sobering, saddening stuff, a tragic portrait of a living hell which, if nothing else, should encourage you to be more vigilant the next time you cross the road."

References

External links
Official Recovery Site at bbc.co.uk
 

BBC television dramas
British television films